Ganshan Township is a township in Changsha County, Changsha, Hunan Province, China. It administers eight administrative villages and one community. Ganshan township merged to Huangxing town on November 19, 2015.

References

Changsha County
Changsha County